Rustayi-ye Chadranshin Owrtin (also Romanized as Rūstāyī-ye Chādranshīn Owrtīn) is a village in Chah Dadkhoda Rural District, Chah Dadkhoda District, Qaleh Ganj County, Kerman Province, Iran. At the 2006 census, its population was 1,558, in 301 families.

References 

Populated places in Qaleh Ganj County